The 1999 Holt by-election was held in the Australian electorate of Holt in Victoria on 6 November 1999. The by-election was triggered by the resignation of the sitting member, former Australian Labor Party deputy leader Gareth Evans on 30 September 1999. The writ for the by-election was issued on 1 October 1999.

Background
Holt was held by Gareth Evans, a former Senator who had moved to the House of Representatives when the previous Labor member Michael Duffy retired in 1996. When Labor was defeated by the Coalition at the 1998 election, Evans resigned as deputy leader and from the Opposition front bench. He announced his intention to retire during the Australian Broadcasting Corporation's television coverage of the 1998 election, but delayed his formal retirement until late 1999.

The Liberal Party did not field a candidate for the Holt by-election, with the main opponents being Labor's Anthony Byrne, and Polly Morgan, the Australian Democrats candidate.

The Holt by-election was held in conjunction with the 1999 referendum on the republic on 6 November, with the residents of Holt voting on an additional by-election ballot paper, as well as the two referendum questions.

Results

Aftermath
Anthony Byrne won the seat easily, with the lack of a Liberal candidate seeing a positive swing to all parties.

See also
 List of Australian federal by-elections

References

External links
 Holt (VIC) By-Election (6 November 1999) Results, Australian Electoral Commission

1999 elections in Australia
Victorian federal by-elections
1990s in Victoria (Australia)